For the state pageant affiliated with Miss Teen USA, see Miss New Mexico Teen USA

The Miss New Mexico's Outstanding Teen competition is the pageant that selects the representative for the U.S. state of New Mexico in the Miss America's Outstanding Teen pageant.

Morgan Buhler of Alamogordo was crowned Miss New Mexico's Outstanding Teen on June 11, 2022, at the Flickinger Center of Performing Arts in Alamogordo, New Mexico. She competed for the title of Miss America's Outstanding Teen 2023 at the Hyatt Regency Dallas in Dallas, Texas on August 12, 2022.

Results summary 
The year in parentheses indicates year of Miss America's Outstanding Teen competition the award/placement was garnered.

Placements 
 Top 12: Natalie Benson (2013)

Awards 
 America's Choice: Natalie Benson (2013)
 Teens in Action Award Finalists: Natalie Benson (2013)

Winners

References

New Mexico
New Mexico culture
Women in New Mexico